Victor Jackson (born August 6, 1959) is a former American football defensive back. He played for the Indianapolis Colts in 1986 and the Los Angeles Raiders in 1987.

References

1959 births
Living people
American football defensive backs
Bowie State Bulldogs football players
Indianapolis Colts players
Los Angeles Raiders players
People from Princess Anne, Maryland